The Saguan Democratic Party was a short-lived political party in Sagua la Grande, founded in 1899. The party was led by Calixto Casals, José V. Andreu and Eduardo F. Rodríguez. The party gathered local interests which opposed the U.S. military occupation of Cuba.

References

Defunct political parties in Cuba
Political parties established in 1899